Code of the Cow Country is a 1927 American silent Western film directed by Oscar Apfel and written by Betty Burbridge. The film stars Buddy Roosevelt, Hank Bell, Elsa Benham, Melbourne MacDowell, James Sheridan and Richard Neill. The film was released on June 19, 1927, by Pathé Exchange.

Cast   
 Buddy Roosevelt as Jim West
 Hank Bell as Red Irwin
 Elsa Benham as Helen Calhoun
 Melbourne MacDowell as John Calhoun
 James Sheridan as Ted Calhoun
 Richard Neill as Bill Jackson
 Walter Maly as Dutch Moore
 Frank Ellis as Tallas
 Ruth Royce as Dolores

References

External links
 

1927 films
1927 Western (genre) films
Pathé Exchange films
Films directed by Oscar Apfel
American black-and-white films
Silent American Western (genre) films
1920s English-language films
1920s American films